Presidential elections were held in the Gambia on 29 September 1996. The first since the 1994 military coup led by Yahya Jammeh, they were also the first elections to be held under the new constitution, and the first presidential elections held separately from parliamentary elections. Voter turnout was exceptionally high, with 88% of the 446,541 registered voters voting.

Despite originally stating that he did not intend to run, Jammeh entered the race shortly before the elections. He emerged victorious with 55.8% of the vote, winning the most votes in every district except Mansa Konko (where UDP candidate Ousainou Darboe was the most voted-for).

The elections were criticised as unfair due to government crackdowns on journalists and opposition leaders at the time.

Results

The number of invalid votes was extremely low due to the country's unique voting system of putting marbles into drums, which meant that almost no votes were rejected.

References

Gambia
Presidential elections in the Gambia
Presidential election
Gambian presidential election